Marius Elvius Kolind-Jørgensen (born 1 June 2002) is a Danish professional footballer who plays as a winger for Danish 1st Division club Vejle Boldklub.

Career

HB Køge & Hellas Verona
Elvius was born in Tårnby and started playing football at Tårnby FF at the age of four. He later moved to Vallensbæk IF, then to Brøndby IF for three years from U11 and U14, before joining HB Køge as an U15 player. Elvius worked his way up through the youth ranks at Køge and on 29 March 2019 the club confirmed, that 16-year old Elvius had signed a deal until June 2022. In the current season, until his new contract, Elvius had scored 23 goals in 16 games for the club's U17 team.

He got his official debut for Køge two days later, 31 March 2019 against Silkeborg IF in the Danish 1st Division. He made a total of three appearances in that season. Later in 2019, Elvius became a permanent part of Køge's first team squad. Elvius began playing more and more.

Elvius began to play more and more, so clubs in Europe also began to take an interest in him. On 21 January 2021 it was confirmed, that 18-year old Elvius had joined Italian club Hellas Verona on loan for the rest of the season, where he was going to play for the clubs U19 team. Elvius played 18 games for Hellas, where he scored five goals and made three assists. At the end of the spell, Elvius was offered a permanent deal by Hellas, but decided to reject the offer and returned to Køge.

Vejle
On 1 February 2022, newly promoted Danish Superliga club Vejle Boldklub confirmed, that Elvius had joined the club on a deal until June 2025. He got his debut for Vejle on 15 May 2022 against FC Nordsjælland in the Danish Superliga.

References

External links

2002 births
Living people
People from Tårnby Municipality
Danish men's footballers
Association football wingers
Denmark youth international footballers
Danish Superliga players
Danish 1st Division players
Tårnby FF players
Vanløse IF players
Brøndby IF players
HB Køge players
Vejle Boldklub players
Danish expatriate men's footballers
Danish expatriate sportspeople in Italy
Expatriate footballers in Italy